Batorowo may refer to:

Batorowo, Poznań County in Greater Poland Voivodeship (west-central Poland)
Batorowo, Złotów County in Greater Poland Voivodeship (west-central Poland)
Batorowo, Warmian-Masurian Voivodeship (north Poland)